Kvetch may be:
 Kvetch, an English word of Yiddish origin meaning 'to gripe', 'someone who complains habitually'
 Kvetch (play), 1991 play by Steven Berkoff